Germantown, Pennsylvania may refer to:

 Germantown, Adams County, Pennsylvania, an unincorporated area in Adams County, Pennsylvania
 Germantown, Cambria County, Pennsylvania, a place in Pennsylvania
 Germantown, Columbia County, Pennsylvania, a place in Pennsylvania
 Germantown, Franklin County, Pennsylvania
 Germantown, Pike County, Pennsylvania, a place in Pennsylvania
 Germantown, Philadelphia, a neighborhood in the northwest section of Philadelphia
 Germantown Township, Pennsylvania, a defunct township incorporated into Philadelphia

See also
 Germansville, Pennsylvania